Richard José Blanco Delgado , (born 21 January 1982) is a Venezuelan footballer that currently plays for Primera División club Mineros de Guayana as striker.

Career

O'Higgins

In 2012, Blanco was runner-up with O'Higgins, after lose the final against Universidad de Chile in the penalty shoot-out.

He participated with the club in the 2012 Copa Sudamericana where they faced Cerro Porteño, being eliminated in the first round. Blanco scored two goals in the first leg in Rancagua, and was chosen the Best Player of the Week.

On December 12, 2012, Blanco was signed for Mineros de Guayana.

International career

Blanco has played in the Venezuela national football team since 2010, scoring 2 goals.

International goals

Honours
Mineros de Guayana
Venezuelan Primera División: 2013–14 Apertura

References

External links
 Richard José Blanco at Football-Lineups
 
 

1982 births
Living people
Venezuelan footballers
Venezuela international footballers
Deportivo Miranda F.C. players
A.S.D. Victor San Marino players
Carabobo F.C. players
Deportivo Italia players
O'Higgins F.C. footballers
A.C.C.D. Mineros de Guayana players
Venezuelan Primera División players
Chilean Primera División players
Venezuelan expatriate footballers
Expatriate footballers in San Marino
Expatriate footballers in Chile
Venezuelan expatriate sportspeople in San Marino
Venezuelan expatriate sportspeople in Chile
Association football forwards
People from La Guaira
21st-century Venezuelan people